McTeigue is a surname. Notable people with the surname include:

James McTeigue (born 1967), Australian film and television director
Felix McTeigue, American musician, son of Maggie Roche of The Roches

See also
McTeague (disambiguation) 
McTigue